This is a list of members of the Victorian Legislative Assembly from 1970 to 1973, as elected at the 1970 state election:

 On 5 March 1971, the Liberal member for Kew and Deputy Premier, Sir Arthur Rylah, resigned due to ill health. Liberal candidate and former East Yarra Province MLC Rupert Hamer won the resulting by-election on 17 April 1971.
 In October 1971, the Liberal member for Gisborne, Julian Doyle, resigned. The Liberal candidate and former member of The Seekers, Athol Guy, won the resulting by-election in December.
 On 9 May 1972, the Labor member for Melbourne, Arthur Clarey, died. Labor candidate Barry Jones was elected unopposed at the close of nominations for the resulting by-election on 9 June 1972.
 On 23 August 1972, the Liberal member for Hampden and retiring Premier of Victoria, Sir Henry Bolte, resigned. Liberal candidate Tom Austin won the resulting by-election on 7 October 1972.

Members of the Parliament of Victoria by term
20th-century Australian politicians